Bădeni may refer to the following places in Romania:

Bădeni, a village in Stoenești Commune, Argeș County

Bădeni, a village in Moldovenești Commune, Cluj County
Bădeni, a village in Runcu Commune, Dâmbovița County
Bădeni, a village in Mărtiniș Commune, Harghita County
Bădeni, a village in Scobinți Commune, Iași County
Bădeni, a village in Dănicei Commune, Vâlcea County
Bădeni, a tributary of the Arieș in Cluj County
Valea Bădenilor, a tributary of the Dâmbovița in Argeș County

See also
House of Badeni
Count Kasimir Felix Badeni, (1846–1909), Austrian Minister-President
 Badea (disambiguation)
 Bădila (disambiguation)
 Bădești (disambiguation)
 Bădescu (surname)